The patient experience describes an individual's experience of illness/injury and how healthcare treats them. Increasing focus on patient experience is part of a move towards patient-centered care. It is often operationalised through metrics, a trend related to consumerism and New Managerialism.

Patient experience (PX) is defined as the sum of all interactions, shaped by an organization’s culture, that influence patient perceptions across the continuum of care.

Patient experience has become a key Quality outcome for healthcare; measuring it is seen to support improvement in healthcare quality, governance, public accountability and, especially in the NHS in England, patient choice. Measures of patient experience arose from work in the 1980s and is now there use is now widescale. However, their effectiveness has been questioned and clinicians and managers may disagree about their use. There is a general agreement in the literature that measuring patient experience can be accomplished using a quantitative, qualitative, or mixed-methods approach.

When patient experience is discussed in terms of experiences with health care services it is similar to patient satisfaction. However, patient experience is often reported in health research as also encompassing people's experiences of illness and injury outside of their experiences with health services, such as those experiences with family and friends, the influence of illness/injury over their capacity to engage in social activities or previously imagined futures, and even their engagement with the development of the guidelines that will inform their treatment. For example, researchers might report of the patient experience of living with heart failure or other chronic illnesses.

Metrics
Patient-reported experience measures (PREMs) are, akin to patient-reported outcome measures (PROMs), questionnaires completed by the patient to assess their experience. These include:

Friends and Family Test
howRwe
GS-PEQ
EUROPEP 2006
Picker PPE-15
NHS Adult Inpatient Survey 2013
Annual GP Patient Survey

References

External links 

 What Is Patient Experience? 

Health care quality
Patient advocacy